Rennard is both a surname and a given name. Notable people with the name include:

Audrey Rennard (born 1933), British gymnast
Chris Rennard, Baron Rennard (born 1960), English politician
Deborah Rennard (born 1959), American actress
Jon Rennard, English singer
Rennard Strickland, American lawyer